Dolichoprosopus subcylindricus is a species of beetle in the family Cerambycidae. It was described by Per Olof Christopher Aurivillius in 1927, originally under the genus Nemophas. It is known from the Philippines.

References

Lamiini
Beetles described in 1927